Michael Trieb (1936 – 25 January 2019) was a German architect, urban planner (SRL) and university professor. He was head of the Department of Urban Design at the Urban Planning Institute at the University of Stuttgart and is now Managing Director of the ISA Group - ISA Internationales Stadtbauatelier.

Life 

Michael Trieb studied architecture and urban planning at the Technical University of Stuttgart and graduated in 1964. In parallel to his academic training, he managed urban planning projects in Paris  and architectural construction projects in Stuttgart from 1959–1964. From 1964 to 1967, he was an architect/partner in the architectural office BTW Brunnert, Trieb und Wössner. From 1967 to 1971, he worked as a district planner and assistant to the City Planner in the Stuttgart City Planning Department. He was a partner in the planning firm URBA from 1971 to 1979. He earned his doctorate in urban design in 1972 and qualified for a professorship in urban design and urban development planning in 1975. Michael Trieb also began his academic teaching career in 1971 and was named Professor in the Urban Planning Institute at the University of Stuttgart in 1976. Three years later, the University named him Chair of Urban Design and Urban Development. He founded the planning studio Stadtbauatelier in 1979. In 2007, the office evolved into the think-and-act tank ISA Internationales Stadtbauatelier, where he remains a partner to this day.

Research 
Trieb’s research   has focussed on anthropocentric, humanistic principles for urban planning, developing what is called Urban City Design (Stadtgestaltung) based on the philosophy of Human Centered Design. 
 Urban philosophy Investigation of both tangible and intangible aspects of a city and developing a holistic, contemporary urban philosophy, based on a pragmatic view of man.
 Urban development planning Practical consequences of this urban philosophy as an anthropocentric basis for urban development, urban management and urban renewal as the means and instruments of urban development planning.
 Urban design Establishment of urban city design as a separate field within urban planning, development and application of a model of understanding and developing urban design within urban planning practice.
 Urban architecture Working on urban architecture as a holistic design problem, analogous to the architecture of individual buildings. Analysis of the building blocks and principles of composition in urban architecture and their application from the urban design concept to design regulations.
 City planning Planning transparency through visual representations understandable by the general public, planners and decision makers to ensure accountability for planning processes and their results.
As part of his step-by-step approach to applied research, Trieb has focussed on presenting  putting up for discussion his theories in publications, academic lectures and as a keynote speaker at professional conferences in Germany, Switzerland, France, Italy, Denmark, Korea, China, Taiwan, Brazil, Chile and the U.S. On the other hand, he always strives to put his theories into practice with specific projects in urban planning in countries around the world, such as Germany, Brazil, Chile, Korea and China. His publications, lectures and projects all serve as sensible steps in a lifelong search for the whole; the way is the goal.

Practice

In his practise, Trieb was and is active as an architect, urban design consultant, design competition judge and a practising urban planner working for the public sector. 
After a thorough training in the “Stuttgart School of Architecture”, he worked mainly as an architect, until he turned his focus to urban planning.

He has served as an urban development and design consultant for various German state governments as well as a consultant for the urban development of Mecca and Medina on behalf of the Saudi Arabian government. In addition he is a member of the Guangzhou (China) Urban Planning Commission.

As an urban planner, he has worked o  in the cities of Stuttgart, Heilbronn, Ulm, Würzburg, Jena, Potsdam, Stralsund, Lübeck and Flensburg, Paris and Cergy-Pontoise, Salvador de Bahía, Santiago de Chile and Talcahuano, Seoul, as well as Beijing, Shanghai and Guangzhou.   Substantive and methodological key projects have included the city development plans for Potsdam and Talcahuano, master plans for Santiago de Chile, Stuttgart, Rendsburg and Konstanz city image plans for the cities of Leonberg, Ludwigsburg, Lübeck and Neubrandenburg, and the New Town planning for Shanghai. Today, Michael Trieb remains active as a partner in ISA Internationales Stadtbauatelier.

Writings and lectures 

Michael Trieb has published numerous books and writings on urban planning, urban development planning and urban design.

Books (Selection)           
        
 1974    Stadtgestaltung – Theorie und Praxis (Urban City Design - Theory and Praxis). In Bauwelt-Fundamente Band 43. Düsseldorf 1974, Bertelsmann Verlagsgruppe GmbH,                 
 1974    Mensch und Stadtgestalt. Beiträge zu Aufgaben und Problemen der Stadtgestaltung (Man and urban cityscape. Articles about tasks and problems of urban city design). (Hrsg. mit A. Markelin). Stuttgart 1974, Deutsche Verlags-Anstalt, 
 1976    Stadtbild in der Planungspraxis. Stadtgestaltung vom Flächennutzungsplan bis zur Ortsbausatzung als Element der kommunalen Arbeit (Urban cityscape in the planning practice. Urban City Design from zoning plan to building ordinance as an element of the local work). (Hrsg. mit A .Markelin).Stuttgart 1976, Deutsche Verlags-Anstalt, 
 1985    Erhaltung und Gestaltung  des Ortsbildes. Denkmalpflege, Ortsbildplanung und Baurecht (Preservation and design of the townscape. Cultural heritage preservation, planning of the townscape and building law) (Hrsg. mit A.Schmidt, S.Paetow, F.Buch, R.Strobel). Stuttgart, Berlin [West], Köln [u.a.], Kohlhammer Verlag 1985, 

Publications (Selection)

 1974    Rahmenplan zur Stadtgestaltung – Beispiel Leonberg (Master plan for urban city design – Example of Leonberg). In Stadtbauwelt 41, Bertelsmann Verlag, Berlin 1974     
 1979    L`architecture de la ville et l `espace public (The architecture of the city and the public space). In Icomos Monumentum Vol. XVIII-XIX, Paris 1979                
 1981    Stadtgestalt – Lebensraum für Menschen(Urban cityscape – Living space for the people). In  Innenministerium Baden-Württemberg (Hrsg.)Stadtgestalt und Architektur Städtebauliches Kolloquium Stuttgart 1981   
 1981    Stadtgestalt und Stadtgestaltung (Urban cityscape and urban city design). In DISP Nr. 63 Institut für Orts-, Regional- und Raumplanung ETH Zürich 1981
 1982    Stadtgestaltung – Aufgaben für Morgen (Urban city design – Tasks for tomorrow). (Hrsg.). Städtebauliches Fachgespräch am 27.08.1982 an der Universität Stuttgart,Band 40 von Arbeitsbericht, Stuttgart 1982
 1982    Dorfgestaltung im Schwarzwald - Hinweise zum Entwurf regionaler Dorfarchitektur (Village design in the Black Forest - Advice for the design of regional village architecture). (mit A. Schmidt) in Dorfentwicklung - Beiträge zur funktionsgerechten Gestaltung der Dörfer(Hrsg.Ministerium für Ernährung, Landwirtschaft, Umwelt und Forst Baden Württemberg), Stuttgart 1982    
 1986    Städtebauliche Erneuerung und Stadtgestaltung in Baden Württemberg (Urban modernization and urban city design in Baden-Württemberg). (Hrsg.).Forschungsbericht SI Universität Stuttgart im Auftrag des Innenministeriums Baden-Württemberg 1986     
 1987    Les espaces urbains: le traitement des espaces urbaines a Lübeck et a Mölln (The public Spaces: Treatment of public areas in Lübeck and Mölln). In Permanence et Actualites des Bastides – Les cahiers de la section francaise de L`ICOMOS. Montauban 1987
 1987    Gestaltungsprinzipien im Stadtbild (Design principles in the cityscape).  In Gestalteter Lebensraum: Gedanken zur örtlichen Raumplanung - Festschrift für Friedrich Moser. TU Wien 1987, 
 1988    Stadtästhetik als soziale Aufgabe (Aesthetics of the city as a social task). In Herausforderung Stadt – Aspekte einer Humanökologie (Hrsg. J.Winter, J.Mack), Frankfurt/M, Berlin 1988	
 1992    Urban Planning. In Korean Architect, Korean Institute of registered architects. June 1992      
 1992    Cities from an ecological viewpoint – Environment and Cities. Seoul 1992 (Korean Institute of Registered Architects)          
 1995    The Balance between Continuity and Change – A Challenge for the historical building as well as for the historical city. In National Cheng Kung University, (Hrsg.) Conservation and Reuse of Historical Buildings International Symposium Khaohsiung/tw 1995        
 1995    Stadtwege –Zufallsgestalt oder Gestaltungsaufgabe(Paths in the city – a random design or a design task). In Der Architekt –BDA 1995,    
 1995    Grundlagen des Stadtgestalterischen Entwerfens (Basic principles of urban designing). (Hrsg. mit E.Hörmann). Ein Seminarbericht des Städtebau-Institutes der Universität Stuttgart, Stuttgart  1995 (14.Auflage)          
 1997    Metamorphosis of Traditional Life Style in Moderrn Housing Culture. In Korean Landscape Architecture 6/1997     
 2000    Architektur und Weltanschauung (Architecture and conviction). (Hrsg.). Ein Seminarbericht  des Städtebau-Institutes der Universität Stuttgart,Stuttgart 2000
 2004    Ziele, Konzepte, Realitäten (Objektives, concepts, realities). In H.Bott, E.Uhl, Perspektiven des Urbanen Raumes, IZKT Universität Stuttgart 2004            
 2006    From Philosophy to Practice – Protection, Renewal and Developoment of Cities. In Stadtbauatelier, Peking 2006
 2014 From Economic Miracle to Quality of Life: Urban Development Experiences & tasks of Practice and Research. In Lee,S.-J. Lee, M.Trieb, Y.Zhang, D.Leyh,Learning from two cultures-Urban Development, Renewal, Preservation and Management in Europe and Asia. China Architecture & Building Press, Peking 2014,

Publications about him 

 Ir Heru Wibowo Poerbo:Urban Design Guidelines as Design Control Instruments with a case study of the Silver Triangle Superblock, Jakarta Doctoral Dissert, Kaiserslautern 2001
 Kostof, Spiro:The City Shaped Urban Patterns and Meanings throughout History,Bulfinch Press, London 1991, 
 Heigl, Franz:Stadtgestaltung, Wien 1985, 
 Kohlsdorf, Maria Elaine:Breve Historico de Espaco Urbano como Campo Disciplinar,In: Farret, Ricardo Libanez o espaco de cidade,São Paulo 1985
 Voigt, Andreas:Gestaltung der Bebauungsstrukturen Wiens durch räumliche Modelle,In: Österreichischer Kunst- u. Kulturverlag, Wien 1997,  
 Reicher, Christa:Städtebauliches Entwerfen, (2.Auflage) Wiesbaden 2013, 
 Hierzegger, Heiner:Räumliches Leitbild der Landeshauptstadt Graz,Magistrat Graz, Stadtplanungsamt, Graz 2004
 Kohlsdorf, Maria Elaine:A Aprensao da Forma da Cidade,Brasilia 1996, 
 Stuttner, Dolores:Die Notwendigkeit einer durchdachten Stadtplanung zum Ortsbildschutz,Grin Verlag, Wien 2009

References

External links 

 Literature by and about Michael Trieb in the catalogue of the German National Library: https://portal.dnb.de/opac.htm?method=showFullRecord&currentResultId=michael+trieb%26any%26persons&currentPosition=1   
 Short biography on  Michael Trieb on www.stadtbauatelier.de: https://web.archive.org/web/20140729230853/http://www.stadtbauatelier.de/index.php?article_id=31
 Publication list: http://www.worldcat.org/identities/ccn-n82-1
 Projects: http://www.stadtbauatelier.com/

1936 births
20th-century German architects
Architects from Berlin
German urban planners
2019 deaths